"Crash Here Tonight" is a song written and recorded by American country music artist Toby Keith.  It was released in August 2006 as the third and final single from Keith's album White Trash with Money.  A shorter all-acoustic version of the song was featured on the soundtrack for Broken Bridges and was played by Keith in the movie.  It peaked at number 15 on the United States Country Charts.

Critical reception
Kevin John Coyne, reviewing the song for Country Universe, gave it a positive rating. He says that Toby has "never sounded better, and he’s finally recording adult and sophisticated material again."

Music video
The music video was directed by Michael Salomon, and it premiered on CMT's Top 20 Countdown on August 31, 2006. It features actress Heather Locklear.

Chart positions

References

Allmusic

CMT

2006 singles
2006 songs
Toby Keith songs
Songs written by Toby Keith
Show Dog-Universal Music singles
Music videos directed by Michael Salomon